Tired of Kissing Frogs is a 2006 Mexican comedy film directed by Lisa Reino.

Cast 
 Ana Serradilla - Martha
 José María de Tavira - Xavier
 Juan Manuel Bernal - Roberto
 Carlos de la Mota - Miguel El Mammer
 Itatí Cantoral - Ceci
 Pedro Damián: Polo

References

External links 
 
 

Mexican comedy films
2006 comedy films
2006 films
2000s Mexican films
2000s Spanish-language films